Long Misty Days is guitarist and songwriter Robin Trower's fourth solo album with cover art by "Funky" Paul Olsen. It was released in 1976.

Track listing
All tracks composed by Robin Trower and James Dewar; except where indicated

Side one
"Same Rain Falls" – 3:14
"Long Misty Days" – 5:43
"Hold Me" – 3:36
"Caledonia" – 3:40

Side two
"Pride" – 3:07
"Sailing" (Gavin Sutherland) – 3:44
"S.M.O." (James Dewar, Bill Lordan, Robin Trower) – 3:41
"I Can't Live Without You" (Dewar, Frankie Miller, Trower) – 4:22
"Messin the Blues" (Dewar, Lordan, Trower) – 3:53

Personnel
 Robin Trower – guitar
 James Dewar – bass, vocals
 Bill Lordan – drums

Charts

References

External links 
 Robin Trower - Long Misty Days (1976) album releases & credits at Discogs
 Robin Trower - Long Misty Days (1976) album to be listened on Spotify
 Robin Trower - Long Misty Days (1976) album to be listened on YouTube

1976 albums
Robin Trower albums
Chrysalis Records albums
Albums produced by Geoff Emerick